The following people were born in, residents of, or are otherwise closely connected to the city of St. Catharines, Ontario:

Fashion
Supermodel Linda Evangelista was born and raised in St. Catharines. Her family still lives there. The breast screening centre at St. Catharines General Hospital is named after her and singer Bryan Adams.

Art 
 Edward Burtynsky, photographer
 Ralston Crawford, was a painter, printmaker, and photographer
Marie Elyse St. George (born 1929), artist, poet
 David Rokeby, videographer spent his formative years in St. Catharines. His father was the Minister at St. Columba Anglican Church
 Jeff Tallon, contemporary artist

Film, television, and media 
 R.J. Adams, (aka Bob Shannon) actor & radio personality, born in St. Catharines, attended Edith Cavell Elementary School, Disc Jockey WKBW Buffalo, KHJ, KFI Los Angeles, Rocky IV, NYPD Blue, Murder She Wrote and dozens of others.
 Mike Beaver, actor/writer, was born in St. Catharines. He has appeared in numerous films and TV shows such as  Billable Hours, Sorority Boys, NCIS, The In-Laws and Queer As Folk
 Jason Cadieux, actor, genie nominated "Lilies", "Iron Eagle IV", founder Essential Collective Theatre
 Rick Campanelli, (aka "Rick the Temp"), former MuchMusic VJ and current reporter on ET Canada, attended Brock University
 Hume Cronyn, late actor and husband of late actress Jessica Tandy, attended Ridley College, which is located within the city
 Jennifer Hollett, former MuchMusic VJ and videographer
 Anna Olson, pastry chef and host of Food Network Canada's Sugar and Kitchen Equipped operated a bakery in Port Dalhousie until April 2009.
 Garry Robbins, starred as Saw-Tooth in the 2003 horror movie, Wrong Turn and was the Mud Monster from the Goosebumps book, You Can't Scare Me!
 Matthew Santoro, YouTube personality, lived in St. Catharines
 Bernard Slade, playwright and screenwriter, born in St. Catharines, was a head writer for Bewitched on ABC, developed the Flying Nun, and created the Partridge Family
 David Sutcliffe, actor
 Dave Thomas, actor/comedian, a former cast member of SCTV. Played the role of pharmacist Russell Norton on TV series Grace Under Fire. Also known for playing Doug of Bob & Doug McKenzie fame.
 John Zaritsky, documentary film maker
 Lauren Riihimaki, YouTube personality, known as LaurDIY
 Robin Duke, writer/actor

Journalists
Peter Gzowski, Canadian broadcaster, reporter and writer attended Ridley College
Laura Sabia, Canadian social activist and feminist, spent a significant amount of time in St. Catharines and served on St. Catharines City Council
Roger Smith, veteran Ottawa correspondent for the CTV national news broadcast

Business
Michael Sabia, CEO of Bell Canada and Bell Canada Enterprises and the son of Laura Sabia, was born and raised in St. Catharines. Angelee Brown, the first female founder of a franchise consulting firm in Canada. Previous employment history includes Manager of Franchising Canada for Tim Hortons and Little Caesars; one of Canada's leading experts in Franchising; board member of CFLC (Canadian Forces Liaison Council) and advocate for women in Franchising and business was raised and resides in St. Catharines.

Musicians
Most of the members of Alexisonfire hail from St. Catharines including Wade MacNeil, Chris Steele, Jesse Ingelevics and Dallas Green. City and Colour's music video for Save Your Scissors was filmed in St. Catharines inside L3 nightclub, a scene shot in the Pizza Pizza on St. Paul St and a scene in Ostanek's Music Shop.
John Crossingham, Juno Award-winning drummer for Broken Social Scene, is a native of St. Catharines and continues to spend a significant amount of the time in the city when not touring with the band.
Two members of the band Our Lady Peace - Raine Maida, lead singer, and Duncan Coutts, bass guitarist - both studied at Ridley College. Duncan was born and raised in St. Catharines and his family still lives there.
Walter Ostanek, Grammy Award-winning musician and Canada's Polka King, is a St. Catharines resident. His store, Walter Ostanek's Music Centre, was located on Geneva Street in the city's downtown area. It opened in the late 1960s and closed on May 31, 2013.
Neil Peart, drummer and lyricist of Rush, was raised in St. Catharines. The song "Lakeside Park" is based on the area of Port Dalhousie where he lived.
Ron Sexsmith, Juno Award-winning singer/songwriter, was also born and raised here, and now lives in Perth County, Ontario.
The Trews, spent a significant time in St. Catharines, before recently re-locating to nearby Niagara Falls.
Matt Thiessen, lead singer and songwriter for the Christian rock band, Relient K, was born in St. Catharines before moving to Canton, Ohio.
Ronn Metcalfe, club owner of the Castle, hosted many great bands of the mid 60's, Ronn was known as the 'king' of The Castle, Leader of "The Ronn Metcalfe Orchestra" which had moderate success and a single called "Twistin' at the Woodchopper's Ball". It charted in both the States and Canada. It was the first all Canadian song to top international charts.
Tim Hicks, country music singer-songwriter born and raised in St. Catharines
Laura de Turczynowicz, née Laura Christine Blackwell, (1878-1953), opera singer born and raised in St. Catharines
James Bryan McCollum, guitarist of The Philosopher Kings and Prozzak, was raised in St. Catharines.
Sammy Jackson, jazz singer
Christian Lalama, pop musician

Novelists
Richard B. Wright, resided in St. Catharines. Wright won the Giller Prize, the Trillium Book Award and the Governor General's Award in 2001 for his novel Clara Callan.

Politicians
Delos White Beadle (1823-1905), city councillor, horticulturist, and journalist
Stuart Garson, former Premier of Manitoba (1943–48), Minister of Justice and Attorney General in Louis St. Laurent's cabinet (1948–57).
Robert Stanley Kemp "Bob" Welch, former Deputy Premier of Ontario (1977–1985), served several cabinet postings under Premiers John Robarts, Bill Davis and Frank Miller, was a lifelong St. Catharines resident. He retired from politics to live in Niagara-on-the-Lake and practice law in St. Catharines.

Sports
Mohammed Ahmed, is a Canadian long-distance runner. A three-time Olympian, he is his country's most successful athlete in long-distance racing, being the first to medal in the 5000 metres at both the World Championships (bronze in 2019) and the Olympic Games (silver in 2021).
Richard Duncan, Competed for Canada in the Long Jump at the Olympic Games and World Championships, Was a CIAU Champion and NCAA Champion, 8-Time All-American while attending York University and University of Texas at Austin, St. Catharines Sports Hall of Fame inductee. 
 Elmer "Moose" Vasko, Chicago Black Hawks, native of St. Catharines
Rick Jeanneret, retired television and radio play-by-play announcer of the Buffalo Sabres.
 Mat “Money Mat” Williamson, the 2020 Super Dirt Series Champion was the first Canadian to do so. Won over 100 north east modified races all over Canada and the United States. 2 time Super Dirt Week winner.
Steve Bauer, Olympic Silver Medalist and one of only two Canadians to wear the Tour de France Yellow jersey, was born in St. Catharines.
Brian Bellows of the Minnesota North Stars and Stanley Cup Champion Montreal Canadiens 1993 is a native of the city.
Gerry Cheevers, former NHL goaltender with the Toronto Maple Leafs and the Boston Bruins. He was inducted into the Hockey Hall of Fame in 1985.
Alan Eagleson, controversial hockey agent and promoter, also a Canadian lawyer and politician. He is known for negotiating famous hockey star Bobby Orr's first contract with the Boston Bruins.
Doug Favell, former NHL goaltender with the Toronto Maple Leafs and Philadelphia Flyers.
Melanie Kok, women's rower who won a bronze medal at the 2008 Summer Olympics in the lightweight women's double in Beijing, China. The inaugural Olympic medal for Canada in this event.
Tim Horton, Canadian NHL hockey player and founder of Tim Hortons restaurants, was not born in the city, but was pronounced dead at St. Catharines General Hospital after his car lost control and crashed on the Queen Elizabeth Way at Martindale Road.
Stan Mikita, born in Sokolce, Slovakia, raised in St. Catharines, member of the Hockey Hall of Fame since 1983, Hart Trophy (MVP) winner, Art Ross Trophy winner, long-time captain of the Chicago Black Hawks and member of Team Canada.
Bryan McCabe of the New York Rangers was born in the city, but raised in Calgary, Alberta.
Andrew Peters, left winger with the Buffalo Sabres of the National Hockey League.
Michael Ponikvar, former world-class high jumper, 2-time Olympic qualifier, 2-time Canadian Junior National champion, NCAA medalist and 3-time All-American. Currently holds the Canadian High School high jump record.
Conor Timmins, ice hockey player for the Toronto Maple Leafs.
Daultan Leveille, centre drafted 28th overall by the Atlanta Thrashers.
Riley Sheahan, centre drafted 21st overall by the Detroit Red Wings.
Dick Pound, former International Olympic Committee Vice-president and current chairman of the World Anti-Doping Agency, was born in St. Catharines and spent his early childhood in the city.
Buffy-Lynne Williams (formerly Buffy Alexander), Canadian rower who won the bronze medal at the 2000 Summer Olympics in the Women's Eight event
Sara Bauer, women's hockey player for the NCAA Division I Wisconsin Badgers, won the 2006 Patty Kazmaier Award as the top women's college hockey player in the United States
Kirsten Moore-Towers, pairs figure skater who spent her early career training at the Winter Club of St. Catharines before changing training bases to the Kitchener-Waterloo in February 2008. Kirsten still lives in St. Catharines with her family. She is the 2011 Canadian Figure Skating Champion and the 2014 Olympic Silver Medalist in Team Figure Skating
Sean Greenhalgh, professional lacrosse player for the Buffalo Bandits of the National Lacrosse League
Mark Steenhuis, professional lacrosse player for the Buffalo Bandits of the National Lacrosse League
Billy Dee Smith, professional lacrosse player for the Buffalo Bandits of the National Lacrosse League
Craig Conn, professional lacrosse player for the Calgary Roughnecks of the National Lacrosse League
Matt Vinc, professional lacrosse goaltender for the Orlando Titans of the National Lacrosse League
Pat McCready, professional lacrosse player for the Toronto Rock of the National Lacrosse League
Ian Llord, professional lacrosse player for the Buffalo Bandits of the National Lacrosse League
Steve Toll, professional lacrosse player for the Rochester Knighthawks of the National Lacrosse League
Corey Small, professional lacrosse player for the Edmonton Rush of the National Lacrosse League
Matt Vinc, Billy Dee Smith, and Steve Toll were all members of the Canadian gold medal-winning team at the 2006 World Lacrosse Championship
William J Bruce III, author  and the former publicist and ministerial agent to the "Million Dollar Man" Ted DiBiase of World Wrestling Entertainment.
Rod Spittle, Champions Tour golfer
Keith Makubuya, professional soccer player for the Toronto FC of the Major League Soccer
Kevin Neufeld (born in St. Catharines), Canadian rower, was a member of the Canadian men's eights team that won the gold medal at the 1984 Summer Olympics in Los Angeles.
Mark Johnston, swimmer who competed in the 2000 and 2004 Summer Olympics, was born and raised in St. Catharines
Jeffrey Finley, professional for the Montreal Alouettes of the Canadian Football League
Hector Pothier, professional for the Edmonton Eskimos of the Canadian Football League. Hector attended Denis Morris high school.
Ronnie Arnell, professional wrestler better known by his ring name Tye Dillinger.
Abu Kigab , NCAA college basketball player for the Oregon Ducks men's basketball was raised in St. Catharines and attended public, middle and secondary school in St. Catharines

War heroes
Fred Fisher, St. Catharines-born recipient of the Victoria Cross for actions during the Second Battle of Ypres in the First World War
Air Commodore Leonard Birchall, St. Catharines-born Royal Canadian Air Force pilot during Second World War.
 Harriet Tubman, Underground Railroad conductor and American Civil War veteran. -->

Criminals
 Karla Homolka, female serial rapist and serial killer who lived in St. Catharines committed her crimes along with husband Paul Bernardo. Their first murder victim was Tammy Homolka (died in 1990) who was the younger sister of Karla. Their second murder victim was Leslie Mahaffy (died in 1991) and third and final murder victim was Kristen French (died in 1992). The crimes committed by Homolka and Bernardo received a lot of media coverage in Canada and foreign media such as the United States throughout the 1990s.

References

 
St. Catharines
St. Catharines